Kalamb (Kalamb Tehsil) is one of eight tehsils in the Osmanabad district in the state of Maharashtra, India. Headquarters for the tehsil is the town of Kalamb. There are ninety-one panchayat villages in the Kalamb Tehsil.

Geography
Kalamb Tehsil borders Beed District to the north across the Manjira River; to the east is Latur District; to the south is Osmanabad Tehsil, to the southwest is Solapur District; and Washi Tehsil is to the west.

Demographics
In the 2001 India census, Kalamb Tehsil had a population of 188,237 with 97,529 males (51.8%) and 90,708 females (48.2%), for a gender ratio of 930 females per thousand males.

In the 2011 Indian census, Kalamb Tehsil was recorded with 219,711 inhabitants.

Towns and settlements
Kasbe Tadawale

Notes

Talukas in Maharashtra